Ezeali Kingsley Chinedu (born 11 September 1993) is a Nigerian footballer who plays as a midfielder for Heartland.

Club career

Enyimba
He joined Eyimba Aba at the start of the 2008.

COD United 
Ezeali joined COD United in summer, 5 January 2015.

Delta Force FC
On 6 January 2018, Ezeali signed a contract with Delta Force FC.

Kada City
On 8 March 2018, he signed a contract with Kada City.

Delta Force FC
On 30 March 2019, Ezeali rejoined Delta Force FC.

Kwara United
On 1 November 2019, Ezeali joined Kwara United.

Heartland FC
On 8 January 2020, Ezeali joined Heartland.

References

External links

1993 births
Living people
Nigerian footballers
Association football midfielders
Enyimba F.C. players
Delta Force F.C. players
Kwara United F.C. players
Heartland F.C. players
Nigeria Professional Football League players
Place of birth missing (living people)
COD United F.C. players
Kada City F.C. players